Sajjad Kouchaki is an Iranian retired military officer who served as the Commander of the Islamic Republic of Iran Navy from 2005 to 2007.

According to an analysis published by The Washington Institute for Near East Policy, Kouchaki was "one of the architects of the country’s naval doctrine".

References

Commanders of Islamic Republic of Iran Navy
Year of birth missing (living people)
Islamic Republic of Iran Navy commodores
Islamic Republic of Iran Army personnel of the Iran–Iraq War
Living people